Memento Mori ( also known as Whispering Corridors 2: Memento Mori) is a 1999 South Korean horror film, and the second installment of the Whispering Corridors film series. It is a sequel to 1998's Whispering Corridors, and is also set in an all-girls high school, but the films are otherwise unrelated. Memento Mori was one of the first Korean commercial films to depict lesbian characters. However, prevailing Korean attitudes constrained its potential to be widely viewed, even more so as the controversial themes targeted the teen demographic.

Synopsis
The film revolves around the relationship between two high school students, Yoo Shi-eun (Lee Young-jin) and Min Hyo-shin (Park Ye-jin). As the two girls become romantically involved, their taboo relationship causes them to be marginalized by the other students.  Unable to cope with the social pressures of having a lover of the same gender, Shi-Eun tries to distance herself from the increasingly dependent Hyo-shin. Hyo-shin reacts poorly to Shi-eun's changed attitude, viewing it as both a betrayal and rejection.  Hyo-shin consequently commits suicide by jumping off of the school roof.  It is also heavily implied that she was pregnant at the time of death, the father being literature teacher Mr. Goh.

The plot unfurls in a nonlinear fashion, often from the perspective of fellow student Soh Min-ah (Kim Min-sun). Min-ah grows increasingly invested in Shi-eun and Hyo-shin when she finds a diary kept between the two alienated girls. This diary allows her disturbing insights to the nature of the relationship and pulls her deeper into a strange chain of events around the school.  After Hyo-shin's death, supernatural occurrences start to terrorize all of the students that condemned the relationship. It is later revealed that Hyo-shin's spirit is malevolently haunting the school through the remnants she left behind in the diary.

Cast
 Park Ye-jin as Hyo-shin
 Kim Min-sun as Min-ah
 Lee Young-jin as Shi-eun
 Baek Jong-hak as Mr. Goh
 Han Min
 Kim Jae-in as Yeon-an
 Gong Hyo-jin as Ji-won
 Oh Min-ae as Nurse
 Lee Hye-mi
 Lim Seong-eon

LGBT representation and horror cinema 
There is no comparable South Korean equivalent to the scope of the Western queer film movement. Despite the increasing visibility of the Korean LGBT movement in the 1990s, when Memento Mori was made, queer films of the time frequently concealed LGBT content behind the guise of other genres, such as horror or romance. The elements of horror featured in Memento Mori, which include telepathy and possession, function as a method of creating distance between the audience's reality and the fantasy of the horror movie, and the characters therein.

The representation of queer characters within a horror context is further aided by Korea's LGBT history. Despite being tolerated throughout most of Korean history, Neo-Confucianism, which came into prominence during the Chosŏn dynasty, eliminated acceptance towards same-sex behavior and “effectively made homosexuality invisible, ghostly.” Despite the societal implication of queer people as inherently ghostly, the film does not treat its LGBT characters as the archetypal monsters, representative of societal taboos, as in the Western horror tradition. Rather, Memento Mori’s queer characters are the heroes the story is centered around, and the ghostly terror is directed at the film’s homophobic characters.

In creating a uniquely Korean canon of the horror genre, Korean horror films have not imported Western-style monsters or slashers; they instead center on a ghost, most often a female ghost. Within the tradition of Korean horror cinema, the female spirit exists to get revenge on their murderers. The ghosts of early horror films typically have “lived a life of repression in a patriarchal family,”  and it is within the context of these heterosexual relationships that most traditional Korean horror film ghosts seek their revenge. However, the horror cycle starting with Whispering Corridors shifts the focal relationship from familial relationships to friendships, particularly those between school aged girls.

The more contemporary version of the Korean ghost story, featuring the ghost of a schoolgirl, is ideal representation for girls, who are taught to internalize their problems. The current education system in South Korea is frequently gender segregated in both middle school and high school, emphasizing distinctive gender norms and attempting to curb sexuality. Lingering Confucian influences play a large role in gender segregated schools, which in turn lead to normalized “homosocial bodily contact” and significant relationships between students of the same gender. This normalized intimacy between schoolgirls makes the jump from the homosocial to the queer relationship of Hyo-shin and Shi-eun plausible to the audience. However, this context of highly interdependent, exclusive female friendships, which become necessary for survival in the highly competitive environment of Korean high schools,  may soften the LGBT themes in Memento Mori as a result of such close relationships being accepted as a “right of passage”.

Release
Memento Mori was released in South Korea on December 24, 1999. In the Philippines, the film was released on January 14, 2004.

References

References

External links

 
Memento Mori at Cine21 

1999 films
1990s high school films
1990s Korean-language films
1999 horror films
1999 LGBT-related films
Films directed by Kim Tae-yong
Films directed by Min Kyu-dong
LGBT-related horror films
South Korean supernatural horror films
South Korean high school films
South Korean horror films
South Korean ghost films
South Korean LGBT-related films